Executive Order 13992, officially titled Revocation of Certain Executive Orders Concerning Federal Regulation, was signed on January 20, 2021, and is the eighth executive order signed by U.S. President Joe Biden. The order works to withdraw certain federal regulation executive orders from previous administrations.

Provisions 
This order aims to deal with critical and prevalent issues. In order for President Biden to tackle matters, such as the COVID-19 pandemic, economic recovery, social justice, and climate change, Biden believes he needs to eliminate past orders from former President Donald J. Trump. In order to address the nation's critical issues such as the COVID-19 pandemic, economic recovery, social justice, and climate change, President Biden intends to employ existing tools. Executive departments and agencies need the ability to make strong regulatory action possible to successfully handle these problems to achieve national goals. This ordinance removes detrimental policies and directives, which threaten to impede the ability of the federal government to deal with such issues and enables agencies to make use of suitable regulatory instruments to achieve these objectives.

Effects 
The order will lead to the Biden Administration having more power and flexibility with executive orders. Since this order will give President Biden the means to strike down past orders that he believes hinder the government's ability to take on the COVID-19 pandemic, economic recovery, social justice, and climate change, Biden will be able to eliminate anything that he finds threatening.
So far, President Biden has used this order to revoke six executive orders signed by former President Donald J. Trump. President Biden eliminated Executive Order 13771, 13777, 13875, 13891, 13892, 13893.

See also 
 List of executive orders by Donald Trump
 List of executive actions by Joe Biden
2020 United States census

References

External links 
 US Presidential Actions
 Federal Register
Executive Order on Ensuring a Lawful and Accurate Enumeration and Apportionment Pursuant to the Decennial Census

2021 in American law
Executive orders of Joe Biden
January 2021 events in the United States